"Who Do You Love" (stylized as "Who Do You Love?") is a song recorded by Canadian pop rock group Marianas Trench for their fourth studio album, Astoria (2015). The song was written and produced by lead singer Josh Ramsay. "Who Do You Love" was released through 604 Records on September 8, 2016 as the record's third and final official single.

Content
"Who Do You Love" is about the desire to become a better person for the one you love.

Promotion
The band released a lyric video for "Who Do You Love" on September 7, 2016 when the song was announced as a single.

Commercial performance
"Who Do You Love" debuted at number 99 on the Billboard Canadian Hot 100 chart dated December 3, 2016. It has since reached a peak position of 56, on the chart dated February 11, 2017. The song also peaked at number 50 on the Hot Canadian Digital Songs component chart. "Who Do You Love" has become the group's most successful single at adult contemporary radio, reaching peak positions of 15 and 9 on the Canada AC and Canada Hot AC airplay charts, respectively. These positions represent the group's highest peak on either chart since Billboard implemented them in late 2012. The song also reached a peak position of 31 on the Canada CHR/Top 40 chart.

Music video
The official music video for "Who Do You Love" premiered on October 10, 2016. In lieu of a conventional video shoot, the group opted to direct the clip's $50,000 budget towards charitable endeavours, in keeping with the "vibe" of the song. A camera crew followed the four members around Vancouver, British Columbia as they performed random acts of kindness, contributed towards a school's music program, and spent time with their families. According to drummer Ian Casselman, they were "trying to inspire people to do good things," with this video and thus ended it with the song's title displayed across the screen with the word "you" italicized for emphasis.

Charts

Certifications and sales

References

2015 songs
2016 singles
604 Records singles
Pop ballads
Songs written by Josh Ramsay
Marianas Trench (band) songs